Christian Melville (9 December 1913 – 23 April 1984) was a Scotland international rugby union player.

Rugby union career

Amateur career
Melville played for the Black Watch and the Army.

Provincial career
He was supposed to play for the Scotland Probables in the first trial match of season 1937-38. The match due on 18 December 1937 was called off due to frost,  despite the contingency of straw being placed on The Greenyards pitch at Melrose. He did however turn out for the Scotland Probables side for the second and final trial match of that season, on 15 January 1938.

International career
He was capped three times for Scotland, all in 1937.

Military career
Melville was in the Black Watch where he was a Lieutenant Colonel. He was awarded the DSO in 1945.

References

Sources

 Bath, Richard (ed.) The Scotland Rugby Miscellany. Vision Sports Publishing, 2007. .

1913 births
1984 deaths
Rugby union players from Edinburgh
Scottish rugby union players
Scotland international rugby union players
Scotland Probables players
Rugby union locks